Carlo Coppari (born 26 May 1989) is an Italian footballer who plays as a midfielder for Filottranese.

Career

In 2009, Coppari signed for Italian third division side Poggibonsi from Mantova in the Italian second division.

Before the 2012 season, he signed for Thai second division club Krabi, before joining Fano in the Italian fourth division.

References

External links
 

Living people
1989 births
Italian footballers
Association football midfielders
Serie B players
Serie C players
Carlo Coppari
Serie D players
A.C. Mezzocorona players
Alma Juventus Fano 1906 players
U.S. Poggibonsi players
Mantova 1911 players
Italian expatriate footballers
Italian expatriate sportspeople in Thailand
Expatriate footballers in Thailand
Sportspeople from the Province of Ancona
Footballers from Marche